Vyšný Kazimír is a village and municipality in Vranov nad Topľou District in the Prešov Region of eastern Slovakia.

History
In historical records the village was first mentioned in 1363.

Geography
The municipality lies at an altitude of 210 metres and covers an area of 7.758 km². It has a population of about 217 people.

External links

https://web.archive.org/web/20070513023228/http://www.statistics.sk/mosmis/eng/run.html

Villages and municipalities in Vranov nad Topľou District